La velata, or La donna velata ("The woman with the veil"), is a well known portrait by the Italian Renaissance painter Raffaello Sanzio, more commonly known as Raphael. The subject of the painting appears in another portrait, La Fornarina, and is traditionally identified as the fornarina (bakeress) Margherita Luti, Raphael's Roman mistress.

As usual with Raphael, the subject's clothing is chosen and painted with close attention; here it is strikingly opulent.

See also
List of paintings by Raphael

Notes

References

External links
 Notes on female paintings by Raphael

1516 paintings
Portraits by Raphael
Paintings in the collection of the Galleria Palatina its Raphael
16th-century portraits